Raymond Chandler (1888–1959) was an American-British novelist and screenwriter. He was born in Chicago, Illinois and lived in the US until he was seven, when his parents separated and his Anglo-Irish mother brought him to live near London; he was educated at Dulwich College from 1900. After working briefly for the British Civil Service, he became a part-time teacher at Dulwich, supplementing his income as a journalist and writer—mostly for The Westminster Gazette and The Academy. His output—consisting largely of poems and essays—was not to his taste, and his biographer Paul Bishop considers the work as "lifeless", while Contemporary Authors describes it as "lofty in subject and mawkish in tone". Chandler returned to the US in 1912 where he trained to become an accountant in Los Angeles. In 1917 he enlisted in the Canadian Expeditionary Force, saw combat in the trenches in France where he was wounded, and was undergoing flight training in the fledgling Royal Air Force when the war ended.

Chandler returned to the US in 1919 to rekindle his literary career, but instead took a job with an oil company until he was fired in 1932 following a bout of depression, womanizing and heavy drinking. He began writing crime stories for the pulp magazines Black Mask, Detective Fiction Weekly, The Fortnightly Intruder and Dime Detective. Between 1933 and 1941, Chandler wrote 22 short stories. In the next 17 years he wrote only three more. In the mid 1940s, some of the first 22 began appearing in inexpensive paperback and hardcover collections published by Avon Books and World Publishing Co. In 1950, Houghton Mifflin published the hardcover collection The Simple Art of Murder, containing a dozen stories selected by Chandler and an essay on mystery stories. Eight stories that he had "cannibalized" (his term) while writing his novels were omitted at his request. After Chandler's death, these eight were published in Killer in the Rain (1964). Selected stories from The Simple Art of Murder were subsequently published in additional paperback and hardcover editions. In 1939, at the behest of the publisher Alfred A. Knopf, Sr., Chandler wrote his first novel, The Big Sleep, for which he used parts of his short stories "Killer in the Rain" (1935) and "The Curtain" (1936). He went on to write seven novels, all of which featured the character Philip Marlowe.

In 1944 Chandler was asked by Paramount Pictures to write the script for the film Double Indemnity with Billy Wilder; the film was nominated for the Academy Award for Best Adapted Screenplay. It was the first of seven scripts Chandler wrote, although two of them were unused. In 1959 Chandler died of pneumonia, brought on by alcoholism. In the aftermath of his death, many of his unpublished writings—including letters, literary criticism and prose and poetry—were released. His biographer, Tom Williams, considers that Chandler's name has become "a touchstone for crime writing, representing not just excellent fiction, but also a type of writing that is at once powerful and beautiful."

Publications in periodicals and newspapers
"The Rose-Leaf Romance" and "Organ Music" are an early short story and an early poem that were included in a collection, but their first printing is unknown.

Novels
[[File:Bogart and Bacall The Big Sleep.jpg|thumb|upright|Humphrey Bogart as Philip Marlowe, with Lauren Bacall in the 1946 film The Big Sleep]]

Chandler left an unfinished novel when he died. This was completed by Robert B. Parker and published in 1989 as Poodle Springs''.

Short story collections

Scripts
Many of Chandler's works were used as the basis for films. The following are where he is credited as the writer of the performed script.

Miscellany

References and sources

References

Sources

 
 
 
 
  
 
  

 
 

Bibliographies by writer
Bibliographies of British writers
Bibliographies of American writers
Mystery fiction bibliographies